The 1973 Giro d'Italia was the 56th running of the Giro, one of cycling's Grand Tours. It started in Verviers, Belgium, on 18 May, with a  prologue and concluded with a  mass-start stage, on 9 June. A total of 140 riders from fourteen teams entered the 20-stage race, that was won by Belgian Eddy Merckx of the Molteni team. The second and third places were taken by Italians Felice Gimondi and Giovanni Battaglin, respectively.

In addition to the general classification, Merckx won the points classification. Amongst the other classifications that the race awarded, José Manuel Fuente of KAS won the mountains classification. Molteni finished as the winners of the team points classification.

Teams

A total of fourteen teams were invited to participate in the 1973 Giro d'Italia. Each team sent a squad of ten riders, which meant that the race started with a peloton of 140 cyclists. From the riders that began this edition, 113 made it to the finish on the Trieste.

The teams entering the race were:

Pre-race favorites

Reigning and three-time champion Eddy Merckx (Molteni) announced he would race both the Vuelta a España and Giro. The break between these two races was only five days. Despite this, and coming off a victory at the Vuelta, Merckx entered the race favorite. Juan Del Bosque of El Mundo Deportivo stated that with the easy route, it won't make Merckx exert much effort to win for a fourth time. Merckx was believed to have a very strong team supporting him at the race, including the likes of Roger Swerts, Victor Van Schil, and Jos Deschoenmaecker, among others.

Felice Gimondi (Bianchi), who won the race in 1967 and 1969, was not viewed to be in good condition entering the race. Despite this he was still viewed as a contender for the overall crown. Molteni director Giorgio Albani felt Merckx's strongest competitor would be Gimondi. Albani elaborated that the Spaniards José Manuel Fuente, Francisco Galdós, and Santiago Lazcano were all dangerous riders in the mountains, but not threats for the overall crown. The KAS team was regarded as a strong opponent to the Molteni squad because of their climbing prowess. Specifically, the writer felt Fuente had performed very little during the 1973 campaign. One writer found Roger De Vlaeminck (Brooklyn) to be a dark horse for the general classification, while another source felt he would be Merckx's biggest threat. Fuente ordered a bike from Faliero Maso (who made bikes for Fausto Coppi) which was said to be a very light bike which should give him more stability. Former winner Gianni Motta (Zonca) also competed in the race and was viewed as a capable rider, but noted that his performances were irregular and his season had been lackluster up to that point. 1971 winner Gösta Pettersson (Ferretti), was viewed as a challenger for the general classification, but one writer felt he lost his "punch." Italo Zilioli (Dreher), Franco Bitossi (Sammontana), and Michele Dancelli (Scic) were other Italian riders that had chances to place high in the general classification.

Marino Basso (Bianchi), Gerben Karstens (Ovest Rokado), Rik Van Linden (Ovest Rokado), Patrick Sercu (Brooklyn), and Bitossi were thought to be the riders that would contend for the stages that finished in bunch sprints. Van Linden and Sercu had beaten the reigning world champion Basso several times during the season so far and one writer stated that he "will have a lot to do if he wants to be worthy of his rainbow jersey."

French filmmaker Claude Lelouch announced he would be making a film that centered around Merckx, which would incorporate footage from the Vuelta a España earlier in the year, along with this Giro d'Italia.

Route and stages

Prior to 1973, there were rumors that the race would be starting in Belgium. Race director Vincenzo Torriani revealed the race route on 5 March 1973. The route was announced to be  over the course of twenty stages that included one individual time trial, while it began with a prologue around Verviers, Wallonia. The race was regarded to have six flat stages and eight "wavy" stages. There were eleven stages containing twenty categorized climbs that awarded points for the mountains classification, with no summit finishes in the race. In total, the race climbed ,  less than the previous year. The route did feature two rest days, on 23 May in Aosta and 4 June in Forte dei Marmi. When compared to the previous year's race, the race was  longer, included a prologue, two less individual time trails, four less summit finishes, and had the same number of rest days.

The route was announced to start in Verviers, before heading towards Italy, passing through The Netherlands, West Germany, Luxembourg, France, and Switzerland. It was branded the "Tour of Europe." It was reported that roughly 50 million liras were paid to the Giro d'Italia from Verviers, Cologne, and the European Economic Community. The route notably finished in Trieste, rather than in Milan, the normal finish for the race. In addition, the route did not visit the Italian islands of Sardinia and Sicily, to which Squibbs from L'Impartial stated that "no one will complain" with regards to Sardinia, while Sicily he felt made the tifosi in various areas of the region "scream." The route as a whole does not venture into the southern half of Italy. It was believed to be that the reason for the avoidance of Milan and other larger cities in the 1973 route came from their large unruly crowds and recent social unrest. The Dolomites were featured in the last two stages of the race.

Upon release of the route in March, some thought it was not a difficult route and Torriani did not want to give Merckx an advantage. Gino Sala of l'Unita wrote following the route's initial reveal that Torriani may throw in some obstacles before the race started that were not in the presented route in March. With the announcement of the route that traveled through so many European nations, Sala speculated that Tour de France organizer Félix Lévitan would try to one-up the Giro for their 1974 race. Squibbs felt the route was well balanced and intelligently designed and thought the harder portions reserved for the very end would make the race garner more interest.

Classification leadership

There were three main individual classifications contested in the 1973 Giro d'Italia, as well as a team competition. Three of them awarded jerseys to their leaders. The general classification was the most important and was calculated by adding each rider's finishing times on each stage. The rider with the lowest cumulative time was the winner of the general classification and was considered the overall winner of the Giro. The rider leading the classification wore a pink jersey to signify the classification's leadership.

The second classification was the points classification. Riders received points for finishing in the top positions in a stage finish, with first place getting the most points, and lower placings getting successively fewer points. The rider leading this classification wore a purple (or cyclamen) jersey. The mountains classification was the third classification and its leader was designated by a green jersey. In this ranking, points were won by reaching the summit of a climb ahead of other cyclists. Each climb was ranked as either first, second or third category, with more points available for higher category climbs. Most stages of the race included one or more categorized climbs, in which points were awarded to the riders that reached the summit first. The Cima Coppi, the race's highest point of elevation, awarded more points than the other first category climbs. The Cima Coppi for this Giro was the Passo di Giau. The first rider to cross the Passo di Giau was Spanish rider José Manuel Fuente.

The final classification, the team classification, awarded no jersey to its leaders. This was calculated by adding together points earned by each rider on the team during each stage through the intermediate sprints, the categorized climbs, stage finishes, etc. The team with the most points led the classification.

There were other minor classifications within the race, including the neo-professional competition. The classification was determined in the same way as the general classification, but considering only neo-professional cyclists (in their first three years of professional racing). The combination classification was a points classification that was tabulated by adding the ranks of a riders position in the general, points, and mountains classifications.

Final standings

General classification

Points classification

Mountains classification

Combination classification

Intermediate sprints classification

Neo-professional classification

Team classification

Aftermath

The race is documented in Jørgen Leth's 1974 film Stars and Watercarriers (Stjernerne og Vandbærerne).

References

Footnotes

Citations

 
G
Giro d'Italia
Giro d'Italia by year
Giro d'Italia
Giro d'Italia
1973 Super Prestige Pernod